Yumin County as the official romanized name, also transliterated from Mongolian as Qagantokay County, is a county situated in the Xinjiang Uyghur Autonomous Region and is under the administration of the Tacheng Prefecture, bordering Kazakhstan's regions of East Kazakhstan and Almaty. The Postcode is 834800.

Administrative divisions 
Qarabura (哈拉布拉镇, قارابۇرا بازىرى) | Jiyek Town (吉也克镇, جىيەك بازىرى)
Township (乡)
 Qarabura Township ( 哈拉布拉乡, قارابۇرا يېزىسى) | Yengiyer Township (新地乡, يېڭىيەر يېزىسى) | Altunemil Township (阿勒腾也木勒乡, ئالتۇنئېمىل يېزىسى)   || Jengis Township (江克斯乡, جېڭىس يېزىسى)
Others
 Chahantuohai Ranch (察汗托海牧场) | 兵团161团 XPCC 161 unit (161-تۇەن مەيدانى)

Climate

References

County-level divisions of Xinjiang
Tacheng Prefecture